Coleophora inusitatella is a moth of the family Coleophoridae. It is found in Algeria, Spain and Portugal.

The larvae feed on the leaves of Phlomis herba-venti and possibly Phlomis russeliana.

References

inusitatella
Moths described in 1920
Moths of Africa
Moths of Europe